

The Fly Synthesis Wallaby is an Italian two-seat, microlight monoplane manufactured by Fly Synthesis.

Design and development
The Wallaby is a high-wing monoplane with a high tail boom and with a 37 kW (50 hp) Rotax 503 piston engine fitted in front of the wing. Below the wing is an enclosed cabin with two seats and a fixed tricycle landing gear. The aircraft is available built or as a kit. A Rotax 582 powered variant, the Wallaby R582 is also available.

The design uses the wing from the Storch CL mated to a new high tailboom fuselage design, with the design goal of producing an economical aircraft.

The aircraft is sold as the Lafayette Wallaby in the United States.

Operational history
Reviewer Marino Boric described the design in a 2015 review as "very pleasant to fly".

Variants
Wallaby R503
Rotax 503 powered
Wallaby R582 
Rotax 582 powered

Specifications (Wallaby R503)

References

Notes

Bibliography

External links

2000s Italian civil utility aircraft
High-wing aircraft
Single-engined tractor aircraft